Halleck Tustenuggee (also spelled Halek Tustenuggee and Hallock Tustenuggee) (c. 1807 – ?) was a 19th-century Seminole war chief. He fought against the United States government in the Second Seminole War and for the government in the American Civil War.

Biography 
Tustenuggee, translated as "Warrior" or "Grand Chief of War", was a common surname for Seminole warchiefs. Halleck was born in central Florida in the Miccosuke clan. He vehemently opposed the seizure of Indian lands by whites, and even killed his own sister by cutting her throat when she talked about surrender. He fought at the Battle of Lake Okeechobee on December 25, 1837, and took control of the Seminole force from their aged warchief Arpeika (also known as "Sam Jones").

On April 22, 1839, Halleck and other Seminole leaders met with Maj. Gen. Alexander Macomb, the new military commander in Florida, and received written assurance that their people could indefinitely remain in Florida if they stayed near Lake Okeechobee. Both parties believed that the war was finally over, but attacks by other bands of Indians in south Florida continued and the ceasefire soon ended.
 
Halleck was severely wounded by U.S. troops at a skirmish at Fort King (in present-day Ocala) in April 1840 against Capt. Gabriel J. Rains (a future Civil War Confederate General). After he recovered, Halleck Tustenuggee went on a bloody rampage in north Florida for two years, leading a series of raids and skirmishes. In January 1842, the army sent the Second Infantry Regiment in pursuit of Halleck's warband. They located the Seminoles' camp near Lake George, but the Indians escaped capture.

Halleck, with a band of seventy warriors, was finally defeated by Federal troops on April 19, 1842, near the settlement of Peliklakaha Hammock (in today's Lake County, Florida), the last battle of the Second Seminole War in Florida. The chief traveled from fort to fort talking about a formal surrender, all the while collecting supplies and rations for his remaining people. Finally, Federal officer William J. Worth, wise to the trick, lured Halleck's family to Fort King with a promise of food and whiskey at a celebration. Halleck soon arrived and was captured. He was held as a prisoner of war with his people on Cedar Key. On July 14, Halleck and 66 of his followers were transported out of Florida for the West. They arrived at Fort Gibson in the Indian Territory on September 5, 1842. Halleck briefly returned to Florida in 1850 to try to negotiate with Chief Billy Bowlegs, who was still opposing resettlement.

During the Civil War, Halleck Tustenuggee supported the Federal government. When Confederate troops and pro-South Indian tribes moved against pro-Union Indians, Halleck joined the band of Creek leader Opothleyahola. He led his Seminole warriors in three battles — Round Mountain, Chusto-Talasah and Chustenahlah, where they were defeated and forced to flee to Kansas in severe winter weather. Halleck and his survivors settled near Fort Row, where several died of exposure and disease.

References

 Fort Gibson muster roll for 1842
 U.S. War Department, The War of the Rebellion: A Compilation of the Official Records of the Union and Confederate Armies, 70 volumes in 4 series. Washington, D.C.: United States Government Printing Office, 1880–1901. Series 1, Volume 8, Part 1, pages 21–23.

Native American leaders
Native Americans in the American Civil War
People of Florida in the American Civil War
People of Indian Territory in the American Civil War
Native Americans of the Seminole Wars
19th-century Seminole people
1800s births
Year of death missing
People of Indian Territory